The 1948 Allan Cup was the Canadian senior ice hockey championship for the 1947–48 season.

Final 
Best of 7
Edmonton 6 Ottawa 2
Ottawa 3 Edmonton 2
Edmonton 7 Ottawa 0
Edmonton 5 Ottawa 3
Edmonton 5 Ottawa 3

Edmonton Flyers beat Ottawa Senators 4–1 on series.

External links
Allan Cup archives 
Allan Cup website

Allan Cup
Allan